The Lemon Drop Kid is a 1934 American comedy and drama directed by Marshall Neilan and written by Howard J. Green, J.P. McEvoy and Damon Runyon. The film stars Lee Tracy, Helen Mack, William Frawley, Minna Gombell, Baby LeRoy, Kitty Kelly and Henry B. Walthall. The film was released on September 28, 1934, by Paramount Pictures.

Plot
Con artist and racetrack tout Wally Brooks hands a lemon drop to a man in a wheelchair, saying it will cure whatever ails him, then persuades the man, a millionaire named Griggsby, to bet $100 on a horse. Wally knows this horse can't win and intends to pocket the cash. The horse does win, so Wally and his partner Dunhill, alias "The Professor," take it on the lam.

Lying low in an out-of-the-way place, Wally meets town drunk Jonas Deering and his beautiful daughter Alice. A love affair blossoms and they marry, but when Alice is about to give birth and having serious medical problems, Wally needs money so he robs Mr. Potter, her boss. Alice dies in childbirth.

A despondent Wally shuns his own son, Wally Jr., and isn't sure where to turn next. The Professor marries longtime girlfriend Maizie and offers to raise Wally Jr., and even better, Griggsby shows up, claiming the lemon drop did help his arthritis. He volunteers to become Wally Jr.'s legal guardian and gives Wally some money, minus what the bet on his horse would have won.

Cast 
Lee Tracy as Wally Brooks
Helen Mack as Alice Deering
William Frawley as William Dunhill
Minna Gombell as Maizie
Baby LeRoy as Wally Jr.
Kitty Kelly as Cora Jennings
Henry B. Walthall as Jonas Deering
Robert McWade as Mr. Griggsby
Clarence Wilson as Martin Potter
Charles C. Wilson as Warden
Eddie Peabody as Banjo Player
Edward LeSaint as Doctor
Dell Henderson as Judge Forrest

References

External links 
 

1934 films
1930s crime comedy films
American black-and-white films
American crime comedy films
1930s English-language films
Films about con artists
Films based on short fiction
Films directed by Marshall Neilan
Paramount Pictures films
1934 comedy films
1930s American films